The GNR Class J9 was a class of two-cylinder steam locomotives of the 0-6-0 wheel arrangement, built in 1896 for the Great Northern Railway.

History
The Class J9s were based on the GNR Class J10, but featured wider cabs and used a different diameter boiler. Ten units were built in 1896, whilst later on, the Class J10s were refitted with the J9's boiler. In GNR service, the J10s were primarily used on heavily graded lines near Leeds and Bradford, and were nicknamed the "West Riding Goods Engines". When the Great Northern Railway was merged into the new London and North Eastern Railway, seven of the original J9s were still in service, whilst three converted J10s were also transferred; both classes were renamed as the LNER Class J7. Between 1924 and 1926, five members of the class were fitted with the  diameter boilers that were also being fitted to the LNER Class J3s. The LNER relegated the class to local traffic, and began withdrawing them in 1927. In 1936, the last remaining member of the class, No. 4027, was withdrawn from Ardsley, with no units being preserved.

References

J09
0-6-0 locomotives
Railway locomotives introduced in 1896
Scrapped locomotives
Standard gauge steam locomotives of Great Britain
Freight locomotives